Beams may refer to:

Music
 Beams (band), a psych-folk band formed in Toronto
 Beams, a 2002 album by Hiromitsu Agatsuma
 Beams (Matthew Dear album), a 2012 album by Matthew Dear
 Beams (The Presets album), a 2005 album by The Presets

People
 Ben Beams (born 1978), Australian rules footballer
 Byron Beams (1929–1992), American football player
 Claye Beams (born 1991), Australian rules footballer
 Dayne Beams (born 1990), Australian rules footballer
 Dovie Beams (1932–2017), American actress
 Jesse Beams (1898–1977), American physicist
 Kristen Beams (born 1984), Australian cricketer
 Mary Beams (born 1945), American artist and animator

Other
 Beams (brand), a Japanese clothing brand.

See also
 Beam (disambiguation)
 Battle of the Beams
 BEAM robotics
 Beam theory